Shwetaunggya (lit. "Golden Valley"), also known as Shwe Taung Gyar, is a locality within Bahan Township, Yangon, Burma. It is one of Yangon's most exclusive neighbourhoods.

History
During the British rule of Burma, Shwetaunggya was known as Golden Valley and served as a prosperous suburb for wealthy European, Chinese and Indian merchants.

References

Yangon